Sevenia occidentalium is a butterfly in the family Nymphalidae. It is found in Sierra Leone, Côte d'Ivoire, Ghana, Nigeria, Cameroon, Gabon, the Republic of the Congo, the Central African Republic, the Democratic Republic of the Congo, Ethiopia, Uganda, Rwanda, Kenya, Tanzania, Zambia and Angola. The habitat consists of forests.

There may be massive population irruptions, leading to migratory behaviour. Adults males mud-puddle and have also been recorded on civet droppings.

The larvae feed on Macaranga schweinfurthii and Sapium species (including Sapium ellipticum).

Subspecies
Sevenia occidentalium occidentalium (Sierra Leone, Côte d'Ivoire, Ghana, Nigeria: south and the Cross River loop, Cameroon, Gabon, Congo, Democratic Republic of the Congo, Ethiopia, Uganda, western Kenya, western Tanzania, Zambia)
Sevenia occidentalium penricei (Rothschild & Jordan, 1903) (Angola)

References

Butterflies described in 1876
occidentalium
Butterflies of Africa
Taxa named by Paul Mabille